William George Howden (born 14 February 1977 in Enfield, London) is a British sailor who competed in the 2008 Summer Olympics and has also participated in the Extreme Sailing Series.

References

External links 
 
 
 
 

1977 births
Living people
Olympic sailors of Great Britain
British male sailors (sport)
Sailors at the 2008 Summer Olympics – Tornado
Extreme Sailing Series sailors
People from Enfield, London